Seva Bharati Mahavidyalaya, also known as Kapgari College, is an undergraduate,  coeducational college situated in Kapgari, Jhargram, West Bengal. It was established in 1964. The college is under Vidyasagar University.

Departments

Science
Chemistry
Physics
Mathematics
Anthropology
Botany
Zoology

Arts and Commerce
Bengali
English
Santali
History
Geography
Political Science
Philosophy
Economics
Physical Education
Commerce

See also

Accreditation
The college is recognized by the University Grants Commission (UGC).

See also

References

External links
Seva Bharati Mahavidyalaya - Official Website

Colleges affiliated to Vidyasagar University
Educational institutions established in 1964
Universities and colleges in Jhargram district
1964 establishments in West Bengal